Teucer is a statue created by the Spanish sculptor Cándido Pazos, located in Pontevedra (Spain). It is located in Saint Joseph's Square above the clock of the central building of the former Provincial Savings Bank of Pontevedra and was inaugurated on 15 July 2006.

History 
Teucer is the mythical founder of the city of Pontevedra. Legend has it that the mythical archer Teucer, son of King Telamon (King of Salamis), followed a mermaid, Leucoiña, in exile to the Ria de Pontevedra and then founded the city.

Before the foundation of the city, Teucer, together with his brother Ajax and his cousin Achilles, had gone to the Trojan War. But when this long war was over and they returned to their country, the heroes were not well received, even by their own families. Teucer, rejected by his father, went in search of a new homeland in the West and arrived in Iberia, travelled along the coast of Hispania, crossed the Strait of Gibraltar and founded a Greek colony called Hellenes, which would become Pontevedra.

Description 
The sculpture is made of bronze and is 6 metres high.

It weighs 2 tons and is anchored by means of a steel spike to the small clock pavilion in the upper part of the Savings Bank of Pontevedra building. The sculpture gives a sensation of lightness that suggests it is floating in the air in a vacuum.

Teucer is depicted as a young naked athlete with a modernist bow and the expression of having reached his destination.

Teucer in the city 
The city named the oldest square in the old town centre Teucer in 1843, which had previously been called Town Square or Bread Square.

On the façade of the Pontevedra City Hall (1880) there is an inscription about the foundation of the town by the Greek archer Teucer.

In the Basilica of Saint Mary Major there is a statue of Teucer carrying the cudgel at the top of the right buttress of its main façade. In 1956, a granite statue of Teucer breaking the jaws of the Nemean lion with a cross behind it was added to the arch of the fountain that closes the square of the Pilgrim Virgin Church.

Gallery

References

Bibliography

See also

Related articles 
 Teucer 
 Plaza de San José
 Plaza de Teucro
 Caixa de Pontevedra

External links 
  on the website Guía Repsol Pontevedra

Pontevedra
Spanish sculpture
Colossal statues
Bronze sculptures
Outdoor sculptures in Spain
Sculptures in Spain
21st-century sculptures
Sculptures of men in Spain
Tourist attractions in Galicia (Spain)
Monuments and memorials in Pontevedra
Monuments and memorials in Galicia (Spain)
Sculptures in Pontevedra
History of Pontevedra